Maihar Assembly constituency is one of the 230 Vidhan Sabha (Legislative Assembly) constituencies of Madhya Pradesh state in central India. This constituency came into existence in 1956.

Overview

Maihar (constituency number 64) is one of the 7 Vidhan Sabha constituencies located in Satna district, it is the most politically motivated city of Satna district with elections hugely dominated and contested by Hindu Brahmins and Patel community. Maihar is part of Satna Lok Sabha constituency along with six other Vidhan Sabha segments of this district, namely, Chitrakoot, Raigaon, Satna, Amarpatan, Nagod and Rampur-Baghelan. Narayan Tripathi is the current MLA of Maihar Vidhan Sabha.

Members of Legislative Assembly
 1952:Ramadhar Pandey, Indian National Congress
 1957: Gopal Sharan Singh, Indian National Congress
 1962: Gopal Sharan Singh, Indian National Congress
 1967: Gopal Sharan Singh, Indian National Congress
 1972: Lalji Patel, Indian National Congress 
 1977: Narayan Singh, Janata Party
 1980: Vijay Narayan, Indian National Congress (I) 
 1985: Lalji Patel, Independent
 1990: Narayan Singh, Janata Dal 
 1993:Mathura Prasad Patel, Indian National Congress 
 1998: Vrindavan Badgainya, Indian National Congress 
 2003: Narayan Tripathi, Samajwadi Party
 2008: Moti Lal Tiwari, Bharatiya Janata Party
 2013: Narayan Tripathi, Indian National Congress 
 2016: Narayan Tripathi, Bharatiya Janata Party (by-election)
 2018: Narayan Tripathi, Bharatiya Janata Party

Election results

2014

See also
 Maihar
 Satna Lok Sabha constituency

References

Satna district
Assembly constituencies of Madhya Pradesh